Villianur is one of 5 Communes in Pondicherry district in the Indian territory of Puducherry. Villianur Commune comes under Villianur Taluk Of Puducherry District. Mannadipet is another commune under Villianur Taluk. Villianur Commune consists of 1 Census Town and 17 Panchayat Villages.

Census Towns
Urban area under Villianur Commune consists of one census town, viz. Villianur and one Gram Panchayat, viz. Kurumbapet.

Panchayat villages
The following are 17 panchayat villages under Villianur Commune:

 Ariyur
 Kanuvapet
 Koodapakkam
 Kottaimedu
 Manavely
 Mangalam
 Odiampet
 Pillaiyarkuppam
 Poraiyur Agaram
 Manakuppam
 Sathamangalam
 Sedarapet
 Sivaranthagam
 Sulthanpet
 Thirukanchi
 Thondamanatham
 Uruvaiyar

PAST MAYOR MUNUSAMY NAICKER(1896-1899)
  During french rule, Pondicherry is divided into several communes and each commune has mayors as its top most administrative officers. At that time the most wealthiest person in a particular commune is appointed as a mayor for administrative duties. In that time Munusamy Naicker is the wealthiest person in villenour commune possessing acres of agricultural lands doing agriculture. He was elected as the mayor of Villenour commune by the french officials. He has hobby of making shiva lingas and buring them under the ground. It has been told that many shiva lingas have been made by him and his sons and had been buried in his native place(SANDHAI PUDUKUPPAM-today).  But surprisingly, we cannot find where he was buried. But recently, a statue of lingam made of limestone has been found in sandhai pudukuppam village making the news about him to be true. We can see his name inscripted in the present day Villenour commune panchayat office at villenour. His successors are residing at Sandhai pudukuppam today.

References

External links
 Department of Revenue and Disaster Management, Government of Puducherry

Ariyankuppam
Communes of Pondicherry